Elizabeth "Betty" Washington Lewis (June 20, 1733 – March 31, 1797) was an American Colonist. She was the younger sister of George Washington and the only sister that survived childhood. Her half-sister, Jane, died at age 11 and her sister Mildred in infancy. Betty Washington was born into the Washington Family as the first daughter of Augustine Washington and Mary Ball Washington.

Born in Westmoreland County, Colony of Virginia, Betty Washington spent her earliest years at the family's plantation on the Upper Potomac. At age seven (her brother George eight at the time), the Washington Family moved to Ferry Farm close to Fredericksburg, VA in search for better economic prospects. Growing up on Ferry Farm, Betty Washington Lewis enjoyed a carefree childhood and was possibly instructed in horse-riding. She also attended school at the same time as her brother George to whom she kept close relations throughout her life. Her carefree childhood ended with the death of her father Augustine Washington in 1743. She was instructed in domestic arts by her Mother and later sent to Fredericksburg for further education, where she was reunited with George and her four brothers. After George permanently left Ferry Farm to live with his half brother Lawrence Washington at Mount Vernon, Betty took on most of the household tasks. In 1750, at the age of 16, she got to spend significantly more time with her cousin Fielding Lewis. 25-year-old Lewis, who had visited Ferry Farm occasionally, sought comfort in Betty's presence after his first wife, Catharine Washington had died due to childbirth the same year. This relationship grew stronger and with mutual attraction on either side, Betty Washington's mother Mary gave her consent. The wedding was held on the Farm, May 7, 1750.  

She and her husband are commemorated with street names in the nearby Ferry Farm subdivision (Fielding Circle and Betty Lewis Drive).

The Kenmore Years and Later Life 
After her marriage to Fielding Lewis in 1750 at age 17, Fielding Lewis bought 861 acres of Land close to Fredericksburg, Virginia. The property was 1270 acres including inherited land. Soon construction of Millbrook House (renamed "Kenmore House" in 1794) ensued where Betty Washington Lewis and Fielding Lewis would spend most of their lives, frequently visited by George Washington who maintained close connections to his family. The growing involvement of Fielding in the Revolution not only strained the estate's budget but also left Betty Washington Lewis mostly in charge of the household and the property. Her tasks were widely expanded after her husband Fielding Lewis died, age fifty-six. Apart from managing Kenmore and her husband's businesses, ownership of the Lewis Store was also passed on to her. After Betty Washington's death in 1797, her stepson John inherited the estate. After the revolution and Fielding Lewis' death, Betty Washington alone was in charge of running Kenmore estate which was heavily mortgaged in order to finance Fielding Lewis' engagement in the Revolution. The debts were paid off by selling the land surrounding the estate and Betty's efforts in running a small boarding School. After 14 years of running the estate, Betty Washington Lewis moved to live with her daughter, Betty Carter at Western View in Culpepper County, Virginia. Betty Washington Lewis died at her daughter's estate on March 31, 1797, aged 63. Shortly after her death, Kenmore estate was sold off.

Marriage and family
Fielding Lewis married Catharine Washington on October 18, 1746. She was his second cousin, the daughter of John Washington (a first cousin to George Washington) and Catharine Whiting. They had three children before Catharine died on February 19, 1750.

A few months later, on May 7, 1750, Lewis married Betty Washington (1733-1797), the sister of George Washington and another second cousin.  She was 17 years old.  They had 11 children together. Betty outlived Lewis by 16 years, dying in 1797. 
Fielding Lewis, II (1751 – 1803); married Anne Alexander, had issue. Married Nancy Alexander, had issue.
Augustine Lewis (January 22, 1752 – 1756); died as a child.
Warner Lewis (June 24, 1755 – 1756); died in infancy.
George Washington Lewis (March 14, 1757 – November 15, 1831); married Catherine Daingerfield, had issue (grandparents of Princess Catherine Murat).
Mary Lewis (April 22, 1759 – December 25, 1759); died in infancy.
Charles Lewis (October 3, 1760 – 1793)
Samuel Lewis (May 14, 1762 – December 31, 1810)
Elizabeth Lewis (February 23, 1765 – August 9, 1830); married distant cousin Charles Carter, had issue.
Lawrence Lewis (March 4, 1767 – November 20, 1839); married half-cousin Eleanor Parke Custis, George Washington's step-granddaughter, had issue.
Robert Lewis (June 25, 1769 – January 17, 1829); married cousin Judith Carter Browne, had issue.
Howell Lewis, Sr. (December 12, 1771 – December 26, 1822); married Ellen Hackley Pollard, had issue, Henry Howell Lewis.

Ancestry

References

External links
 Pamela Gould, George W., sister, have birthday tea, The Free Lance-Star, February 18, 2008, found at Fredericksburg.com news site. Accessed February 19, 2008.

1733 births
1797 deaths
18th-century American Episcopalians
British North American Anglicans
Lewis family
People from Fredericksburg, Virginia
People from Westmoreland County, Virginia
People of Virginia in the American Revolution
Virginia colonial people
Washington family
Burials in Virginia